Konevo may refer to:
Konevo, Kardzhali Province, Bulgaria
Konevo, Razgrad Province, a populated place in Isperih Municipality, Bulgaria
Konevo, Shumen Province, Bulgaria
Konevo, Russia, a list of rural localities in Russia